A number of steamships operated by Det Stavangerske Dampskibsselskab have carried the name Tungenes.
 , shelled and sunk 24 January 1945
 , ex Grimsnes, in service 1947–61
 , built as Rogaland, carried name Tungenes 1964–65, now a museum ship at Stavanger

Ship names